Oceanida is a genus of very small parasitic sea snails, marine gastropod mollusks or micromollusks in the family Eulimidae.

This genus was described by Léopold de Folin in 1870. These are subtidal snails that are parasitic on echinoderms. Their length varies between 2 and 3 mm.

Species
Species within this genus include:
 Oceanida abrejosensis Bartsch, 1917
 Oceanida confluens Bouchet & Warén, 1986
 Oceanida corallina Hedley, 1912
 Oceanida faberi De Jong & Coomans, 1988 - the common labeo - found from Aruba to Northeast Brazil.
 Oceanida graduata de Folin, 1871 - the shouldered eulima - distributed in North America; Western Atlantic Ocean; synonyms : Spiroclimax scalaris Mörch, 1875; Athleenia burryi Bartsch, 1946
 Oceanida hypolysina Melvill, 1904
 Oceanida inglei Lyons, 1978 - distributed in North America; Western Atlantic Ocean
 Oceanida lampra Melvill, 1918
 Oceanida mindoroensis Adams & Reeve, 1850
 Oceanida whitechurchi Turton, 1932
Species brought into synonymy
 Oceanida burryi (Bartsch, 1946): synonym of Oceanida graduata de Folin, 1871
 Oceanida catalinensis (Bartsch, 1920) : synonym of Pseudosabinella bakeri (Bartsch, 1917)
 Oceanida lepida (A. Adams, 1864): synonym of Leiostraca pygmaea A. Adams, 1864
 Oceanida ovalis de Folin, 1884: synonym of Doliella nitens''' (Jeffreys, 1870)
 Oceanida pumila A. Adams, 1864 (taxon unverified- still inquarantine at WoRMS)
 Oceanida tumerae Laseron, 1955: unpublished combination for Hebeulima tumere Laseron, 1955)
 Oceanida scalaris (Mörch, 1875): synonym of Oceanida graduata de Folin, 1871

References

 Jong, K. M. de and H. E. Coomans. 1988. Marine gastropods from Curaçao, Aruba and Bonaire Studies on the Fauna of Curaçao and other Caribbean Islands 69 1-261, 47 pls.
 de Folin L. 1870. D'une méthode de classification pour les coquilles de la famille des Chemnitzidae. Annales de la Société Linnéenne du Département du Maine et Loire 12: 191-202
Folin, L. de. 1871. Nouveau supplément aux mollusques de la Pointe-à-Pitre In: L. de Folin & L. Périer ed. Les Fonds de la Mer 1 263-265, pl. 24 Savy: Paris
Morch, O. A. L. 1875. Synopsis molluscorum marinorum Indiarum occidentalium Malakozoologische Blätter 22 142-184.
 Lyons, W. G. 1978. Status of the genus Oceanida DeFolin (Gastropoda: Eulimidae), with a description of a new species'' Proceedings of the Biological Society of Washington 91 539-545.
(.pdf document)

External links
ITIS
Photo of Oceanida faberi

Eulimidae
Gastropod genera